Les Voivres is a commune in the Vosges department in Grand Est in northeastern France.

Geography
The Côney forms most of the commune's northwestern border; a stream called le Jeandin, tributary of the Côney, forms the commune's northern border.

See also
Communes of the Vosges department

References

Communes of Vosges (department)